Anthony Basil Taylor (born April 24, 1954) is an American prelate of the Roman Catholic Church who has been bishop of the Diocese of Little Rock in Arkansas since 2008. He was a priest of the Archdiocese of Oklahoma from 1980 to 2008, interrupted by studies in New York at Fordham University. Much of his career has focused on service to the Hispanic community.

Biography

Early life and education
Anthony Taylor was born in Fort Worth, Texas, on April 24, 1954, the oldest of seven children born to Basil and Rachel (Roth) Taylor. His parents and grandparents on both sides were long-time residents of Fort Worth. Two of his grandparents are converts to Catholicism (his mother's father from Judaism and his father's mother from Protestantism). The family moved to Ponca City, Oklahoma, in 1960.

Taylor attended parochial and public schools in Ponca, graduating from high school in 1972. He attended the University of Oklahoma in Norman, Oklahoma, for two years and then entered St. Meinrad Seminary College in St. Meinrad, Indiana, graduating with a Bachelor of History degree. From 1976 to 1980, Taylor trained for the priesthood at the Pontifical North American College in Rome while studying theology at the Pontifical Gregorian University.

Ordination and ministry
Taylor was ordained a priest by Archbishop Charles Salatka for the Archdiocese of Oklahoma City on August 2, 1980, at St. Mary Parish in Ponca City. His first assignment was to Sacred Heart Parish in Oklahoma City. Within a month of his ordination he started celebrating the Mass in Spanish twice a month in Clinton and Hinton, Oklahoma. In 1982 he was transferred to western Oklahoma, where he lived at Queen of All Saints mission in Sayre until 1986.

Taylor studied at Fordham University in New York City during the summers of 1984 and 1985, and then full-time from 1986 to 1988. At the same time, he served Holy Rosary Parish in the Bronx. He earned a doctorate in 1989. The title of his dissertation was "The Master-Servant Type Scene in the Parables of Jesus".

Upon his return to Oklahoma in 1989, Taylor was named the vicar for ministries of the archdiocese, a post he held for 20 years. He was responsible for ministry to priests and, for a number of years, was also responsible for the permanent diaconate program. He had responsibility for the orientation and oversight of the international priests serving in Oklahoma, for newly ordained priests in their first year of ministry, and for priests in their first year as pastors. 

Taylor was vicar of four Oklahoma parishes from 1990 to 1993: 

 Immaculate Conception 
 Saint Robert Bellarmine 
 Saint Mary
 Saint Joseph

In 1993, Taylor became the founding pastor of St. Monica Parish in Edmond, Oklahoma. In 2003 he returned as pastor to Sacred Heart Parish in Oklahoma City, the largest Hispanic parish in the Archdiocese. 

Taylor served as chair of the Presbyteral Council, the Personnel Board and the Retirement Board.  He was a member of the archdiocesan Finance Council and a board member of the Mount St. Mary High School in Oklahoma City.

In 2006, on the 25th anniversary of the death of Father Stanley Rother, an Oklahoma priest killed in Guatemala, the archdiocese named Taylor its delegate for the cause of Rother's canonization. Taylor had met Rother just once, shortly before his death. In Guatemala, Taylor interviewed more than 50 people who worked with Rother or witnessed his death. His role ended when he left the Oklahoma for Little Rock.

Bishop of Little Rock
Taylor was appointed bishop of the Diocese of Little Rock by Pope Benedict XVI on April 10, 2008. He received his episcopal consecration on June 5, 2008, at the Statehouse Convention Center in Little Rock from Archbishop Eusebius J. Beltran of Oklahoma City.

Building on his work with the Hispanic community and work in Guatemala, Taylor has made immigrants a focus of his episcopacy. In June 2009, the U.S. Conference of Catholic Bishops (USCCB) elected Taylor to the board of the Catholic Legal Immigration Network (CLINIC), which provides legal services to low-income immigrants in the U.S. In 2010, he was one of the bishops representing the USCCB at a conference of regional bishops who endorsed a joint statement on immigration reform. In 2012, as member of the USCCB Committee on Migration he led a delegation to the Middle East that reported on the plight of Syrian refugees. In 2014 he was elected by the USCCB to serve on its Catholic Legal Immigration Network Board.

In 2012, Taylor delivered a homily on how Catholics should approach the 2012 Presidential elections. Journal Michael Winters, while criticizing some details, praised Taylor's ability to frame the issues without partisanship.

In September 2018, Taylor released the results of a third-party review that identified 12 former priests of the Diocese (one previously known) against whom there were credible allegations of sexual abuse of a minor. An update in February 2019 included priests accused elsewhere who had served in Little Rock.

At the annual USCCB meeting in November 2019, Taylor was elected to the board of Catholic Relief Services. He was elected to a second three-year term in 2022.Following the release of Traditionis custodes in July 2021, Taylor announced that the celebration of the Tridentine Mass in his diocese would be limited to two parishes administered by the Priestly Fraternity of Saint Peter.  Any other parishes offering mass according to the 1962 Roman Missal were ordered to stop it.

References

External links
 Diocese of Little Rock

 

1954 births
Living people
Roman Catholic Archdiocese of Oklahoma City
Roman Catholic bishops of Little Rock
Bishops appointed by Pope Benedict XVI
21st-century Roman Catholic bishops in the United States
People from Ponca City, Oklahoma
Ponca City High School alumni
Pontifical North American College alumni
Pontifical Gregorian University alumni
University of Oklahoma alumni
Fordham University alumni
Religious leaders from Texas
Catholics from Oklahoma